The 5th constituency of the Pas-de-Calais is a French legislative constituency in the Pas-de-Calais département.

Description

Pas-de-Calais' 5th constituency consists of the port of Boulogne-sur-Mer and its surrounding hinterland. The seat was radically altered as a result of 2010 redistricting of French legislative constituencies so that it included the whole of Boulogne-sur-Mer rather than just its southern parts as had been the case since 1988.

The seat elected Frédéric Cuvillier in the 1st round of the 2012 election suggesting that the seat was considered as safe for his party the PS. However, LREM gained the seat in 2017 as the PS vote collapsed across France.

Historic Representation

Election results

2022

 
 
 
 
 
 
 
 
 
 

 
 
 
 
 

* PS dissident

2017

2012

2007

 
 
 
 
 
 
 
|-
| colspan="8" bgcolor="#E9E9E9"|
|-

2002

 
 
 
 
 
 
|-
| colspan="8" bgcolor="#E9E9E9"|
|-

1997

 
 
 
 
 
 
 
 
|-
| colspan="8" bgcolor="#E9E9E9"|
|-

Sources
 Official results of French elections from 1998: 

5